Saunassa is an 1889 oil painting by Akseli Gallen-Kallela. It was painted in Ekola's croft in Keuruu. Gallen-Kallela gave his work to Knut Tilgmann, whose brother gave it to Ateneum in 1922. Gallen-Kallela didn't like the picture and thought that it was unfinished.

References

Janne Gallen-Kallela-Sirén: Minä palaan jalanjäljilleni - Akseli Gallen-Kallelan elämä ja taide. Otava 2002. pages 104–108.

Sauna
Paintings by Akseli Gallen-Kallela
Paintings in the collection of the Ateneum
1889 paintings